Hayfield Township may refer to the following townships in the United States:

 Hayfield Township, Crawford County, Pennsylvania
 Hayfield Township, Dodge County, Minnesota